Alyaksey Pohe (born 9 April 1977) is a retired Belarusian professional footballer.

External links
Profile at teams.by

1977 births
Living people
Belarusian footballers
FC Naftan Novopolotsk players
FC Smorgon players
FC Vitebsk players
FC Belshina Bobruisk players
FC Polotsk players
FC Khimik Svetlogorsk players
Association football goalkeepers
FC Lokomotiv Vitebsk (defunct) players